The Goldstone Commission, formally known as the Commission of Inquiry Regarding the Prevention of Public Violence and Intimidation, was appointed on 24 October 1991 to investigate political violence and intimidation in South Africa. Over its three-year lifespan, it investigated incidents occurring between July 1991 and April 1994, when democratic elections were held. The relevant incidents thus occurred during the negotiations to end apartheid. The Commission's mandate was both to investigate the causes of the violence and to recommend measures to contain or prevent it.

The Commission played a critical role in defusing the political violence that erupted when apartheid in South Africa began eroding in the late 1980s as the country moved toward its first democratic elections, and concluded that political violence was fuelled by a 'third force'.

The Commission was established in terms of the Prevention of Public Violence and Intimidation Act of 1991, as a condition of the National Peace Accord of September 1991. President F. W. de Klerk appointed Justice Richard Goldstone to chair it. It operated from 24 October 1991 to 27 October 1994 and, over that period, submitted 47 reports to the President. The Commission was fairly large: its investigation team, set up in 1992, comprised five units, staffed by 13 police officers, ten attorneys, and five international observers. It had offices in Johannesburg, Durban, Port Elizabeth, Cape Town, and East London. 

Some of the Commission's reports focused on broad thematic concerns, such as taxi violence (to which seven separate reports were dedicated) or the effects of political violence on children. Others investigated specific allegations or events, among them some of the most prominent incidents of political violence of the period, including the Boipatong massacre, the Bisho massacre, the storming of the Kempton Park World Trade Centre, and the Shell House massacre. Several reports investigated the role of the South African Police and South African Defence Force in political violence, and particular public attention was given to the May 1993 report on allegations of a third force, as well as to related reports such the report of the Malcolm Wallis-led subcommittee on the causes of the violence between the African National Congress and Inkatha.

Commissioners 
The Commissioners were:

 Richard Goldstone
 Danie Rossouw
 Solly Sithole
 Lillian Baqwa
 Gert Steyn

Other individuals served on multi-national panels, acted as observers, or participated in committees under the Commission.

Investigations

References

External links 

 Records of the Commission's inquiry into the conduct of 32 Battalion in Phola Park
Records of the Commission's inquiry into the Boipatong massacre

Events associated with apartheid
Public inquiries in South Africa